The Boeing 8C was a gas turbine that was tested in a Ford Thunderbird The turbine was capable at 175hp and required exhaust pipes to be installed at the front out the side. It was developed around August 1955 to March 1956 after the Ford Thunderbird was released to the public. However the project remained a secret until 2022.

See also
List of aircraft engines

Reflist

Airplane powered car
 

1950s turboshaft engines
Aircraft auxiliary power units
Gas turbines
Centrifugal-flow turbojet engines